The New Mexico Mustangs were a Tier II Junior A ice hockey team based out of Rio Rancho, New Mexico that began play in the 2010–11 season. They were a member of the North American Hockey League and played in the South Division. The Mustangs played their home games in the Santa Ana Star Center.
The Mustangs were affiliated with the New Mexico Renegades, a Tier III Jr A team in the Western States Hockey League

After the 2011–12 season, the Mustangs suspended operations and granted inactive status by the league. On December 21, 2012, the franchise was purchased and relocated to Richfield, Minnesota, where they are known as the Minnesota Magicians.

Season records

References

External links
 Official Website

Defunct North American Hockey League teams
Ice hockey teams in New Mexico
Sports in Rio Rancho, New Mexico
Ice hockey clubs established in 2010
Ice hockey clubs disestablished in 2012
2010 establishments in New Mexico
2012 disestablishments in New Mexico